Samantha Vang (born 1993/1994) is an American politician serving in the Minnesota House of Representatives since 2019. A member of the Minnesota Democratic–Farmer–Labor Party (DFL), Vang represents District 38B in the northwestern Twin Cities metropolitan area, which includes parts of the cities of Brooklyn Center and Brooklyn Park in Hennepin County, Minnesota.

Early life, education, and career
Vang was born and raised in north Minneapolis. Her parents are Hmong refugees from Thailand. She graduated from Robbinsdale Armstrong High School and from Gustavus Adolphus College, with a Bachelor of Science in political science and communications.

Minnesota House of Representatives
Vang was first elected to the Minnesota House of Representatives in 2018, after the retirement of incumbent Debra Hilstrom, and has been reelected every two years since.

From 2021-22, Vang served as vice chair of the Agriculture Finance and Policy Committee, and a co-chair of the People of Color and Indigenous Caucus, and co-founder of the Minnesota Asian Pacific Caucus. Vang is the chair of the Agriculture Finance and Policy Committee, and sits on the Environment and Natural Resources Finance and Policy, Higher Education Finance and Policy, and Legacy Finance Committees.

In the aftermath of the shooting of Daunte Wright by a police officer in Brooklyn Center, Vang's hometown and constituency, she spoke out on the need to enforce the oversight ability of the Peace Officer Standards and Training Board in Minnesota, and the need to terminate the statute of limitations for civil suits against law enforcement.

Vang has introduced two bills into the legislature proposing an end to commercial turtle harvesting in Minnesota: one in 2019, which did not make it into the final 2019 Fish and Game bill in the Senate, and one in 2021. She also authored a bill in 2021 that would allow cities to impose bans on any pesticide the Minnesota Department of Agriculture designated as "pollinator-lethal".

Electoral history

Personal life
Vang resides in Brooklyn Center, Minnesota.

References

External links

 Official House of Representatives website
 Official campaign website

1990s births
Living people
People from Brooklyn Center, Minnesota
Gustavus Adolphus College alumni
Democratic Party members of the Minnesota House of Representatives
21st-century American politicians
21st-century American women politicians
Women state legislators in Minnesota
American politicians of Hmong descent
Asian-American people in Minnesota politics